Michael Dwayne Weaver (born June 13, 1951) is an American former professional boxer who competed from 1972 to 2000, and held the WBA heavyweight title from 1980 to 1982.

Marines
Weaver was a member of the United States Marine Corps from 1968 to 1971, and went to Vietnam. During this time he started amateur boxing and training.

Professional career

Early years
By 1972 Weaver was living and training in California, and took up professional boxing. In his early career, Weaver was considered a journeyman opponent. He was frequently brought in on short notice and overmatched against more experienced and developed contenders, and used as a sparring partner for Muhammad Ali and Ken Norton, who famously nicknamed him "Hercules" due to his top developed muscle definition.

In 1976 Weaver beat well regarded veteran Jody Ballard, and in 1978 lost two close decisions. First to contender Stan Ward for the California State Heavyweight title, and then to Leroy Jones for the NABF heavyweight title.

Heavyweight contender
In late 1978 Weaver got a new team and manager and reeled off five straight knockouts, two of which came over top ranked opponents. In October 1978 he came off the floor to knock out hard hitting Colombian Bernardo Mercado in 5, and in January 1979 knocked out hulking old foe Stan Ward in 9 to win the USBA heavyweight title.

WBC heavyweight title challenge against Larry Holmes
These wins helped get him a high-profile world title fight against  undefeated WBC champion Larry Holmes in New York's Madison Square Garden in June 1979. New cable channel HBO bought the rights to the fight as Weaver was so lowly-regarded the fight was seen as a mismatch and the networks didn't want anything to do with it (Weaver was 20–8 to Holmes' 30–0).

But, in a brutal contest, Weaver proved far better than expected, however, and gave Holmes a really tough battle. Holmes would rally  by decking Weaver with a sharp uppercut in the 11th and in the 12th, Holmes pounded  Weaver with powerful rights until the referee stopped the fight.

USBA heavyweight title contest
Although Weaver had lost, his surprise showing had made him a deserved high-profile name. Later in the year he was back, retaining his USBA belt with a 12-round decision over Scott LeDoux whom he outboxed rather than slugged with. Using his jab a lot gaining complimentary reviews generally.

WBA heavyweight champion
In March 1980, Weaver fought John Tate for the WBA title, in Tate's backyard of Knoxville, Tennessee. Tate was an amateur star from the 1976 Olympic team. As a pro he had put together a 20–0 record and won the vacant WBA title by decisioning South African Gerrie Coetzee over fifteen rounds, in front of 86,000 hostile fans in Pretoria, South Africa.

Weaver vs. Tate produced one of the divisions finest knockouts ever. The taller Tate dominated Weaver for all the first 10 rounds. But then with sheer determination a battered Weaver suddenly turned it around, pushing Tate backward. But he'd left it too late, according to the commentators, as only 5 rounds remained and Tate was expected to resume his lead. However, with only 40 seconds left in the 15th round, Weaver caught Tate bouncing off the ropes towards him with a devastating left hook. It dropped Tate to the canvas out cold for well over a minute. Press pictures showed Tate sound asleep whilst Weaver did a handstand alongside to celebrate.

In October 1980 Weaver made his first defense, traveling to Sun City, South Africa, to fight Gerrie Coetzee. Weaver was hurt and nearly knocked down in the 8th round but rallied down the stretch and knocked Coetzee out in the 13th round. Coetzee, a good boxer/puncher, had never previously been down, amateur or pro.

In 1981 Weaver outpointed the spoiler James "Quick" Tillis over 15 rounds in Chicago to retain his title after a year's inactivity.

Losing the title to Michael Dokes; controversy

After another year's inactivity, Weaver took on highly regarded Michael Dokes in Las Vegas, December 10, 1982. Dokes came out fast and dropped Weaver inside the opening minute. As Weaver covered up on the ropes and Dokes missed a few swings, referee Joey Curtis stopped the fight after 1:03 had passed and awarded Dokes the victory by technical knockout. This caused controversy due to the timing of the stoppage, and many in the arena accused the fight of being fixed.

However, four weeks earlier, the fatal fight between Ray Mancini and Duk Koo Kim at Caesars' Palace had taken place where Kim died as a result of a brain injury.  On the morning of the fight, Nevada State Athletic Commission officials warned all officials participating in the card to protect the health of the boxers in order to avoid another potential fight-related fatality, which Curtis responded, "Everybody has Duk Koo Kim in the back of his mind," referring to the November 13 fight, as Dr. Lonnie Hammargren, a doctor who had performed brain surgery in a futile attempt to save Kim, attended the meeting. (ESPN later ranked this the #7 worst bad call by a referee in a fight, doing so in 2008.)

Weaver was given a rematch with Dokes on May 20, 1983, which ended in a 15-round majority draw; judge Jerry Roth gave Dokes a four-point victory while judges Harold Lederman and Larry Hazzard had it even.

Further title challenges and later career
In June 1985 Weaver took on Pinklon Thomas, who then held the WBC title. Weaver lost by eighth-round knockout. This would be Weaver's last title challenge although a notable 2nd-round KO of Carl "The Truth" Williams a skilled boxer would follow the defeat to Thomas. Weaver continued to fight for another 15 years. His career ended at the age of 49 with a sixth-round KO rematch loss to Larry Holmes.

Professional boxing record

References

External links

1951 births
Living people
People from Gatesville, Texas
Boxers from Texas
World heavyweight boxing champions
World Boxing Association champions
United States Marines
American male boxers
United States Marine Corps personnel of the Vietnam War